Phrynopus tribulosus is a species of frog in the family Strabomantidae. It is endemic to Peru and only known from its type locality near Oxapampa at  asl, and from Santa Bárbara, in the Huancabamba District, Oxapampa, Pasco Region. It inhabits humid montane forests where individuals could be found deep within a mossy bank by day.

Description
The body is slim. The dorsum is finely granular and has elongate dorsolateral warts that form a long discontinuous row without joining to a fold. There is a conspicuous X-shaped mid-dorsal fold. The supratympanic fold is weak and no tympanum is present. The fingers and toes have no fringes, webbing, or discs, but the finger tips are slightly swollen. Dorsal coloration is tan with various diffuse black blotches and bluish-white dorsal granules. There is a bold black mask running from the snout through the eye and over to the sypratympanic area. The flanks and extremities are tan with abundant bluish-white spots. The lower parts are gray and have small, marmorated, brown, and metallic blue blotches.

References

tribulosus
Frogs of South America
Amphibians of the Andes
Amphibians of Peru
Endemic fauna of Peru
Amphibians described in 2008
Taxa named by William Edward Duellman
Taxa named by Stephen Blair Hedges